The Kesamutti Sutta, popularly known in the West as the Kālāma Sutta, is a discourse of the Buddha contained in the Aṅguttara Nikaya (3.65) of the Tipiṭaka. It is often cited by those of the Theravada and Mahayana traditions alike as the Buddha's "charter of free inquiry."

The Kesamutti Sutta is often incorrectly used for advocating prudence by the use of sound logical reasoning arguments for inquiries in the practice that relates to the discipline of seeking truth, wisdom and knowledge whether it is religious or not. However, a plain reading of the text clearly states that one should not determine the validity of tradition based "by logical conjecture, by inference, by analogies, by agreement through pondering views, by probability, or by the thought, 'This contemplative is our teacher.'" While nothing in the text limits one from employing their own reasoning, the Buddha instructs not to make a decision based alone on it. Instead, the Buddha teaches that one can determine the validity of a tradition if "These qualities are skillful; these qualities are blameless; these qualities are praised by the wise; these qualities, when adopted & carried out, lead to welfare & to happiness' — then you should enter & remain in them." The misunderstanding of this sutta has become popular in part by reliance on a fake quote attributed to the Buddha and this sutta that includes "when you find that anything agrees with reason and is conducive to the good and benefit of one and all, then accept it and live up to it," which is in part the opposite of what the sutta actually states.



Premise 
The sutta starts off by describing how the Buddha passes through the village of Kesaputta and is greeted by its inhabitants, a clan called the Kalamas. They ask for his advice: they say that many wandering holy men and ascetics pass through, expounding their teachings and criticizing the teachings of others. So whose teachings should they follow? He delivers in response a sermon that serves as an entry point to the Dhamma, the Buddhist teachings for those unconvinced by mere spectacular revelation.

Discerning Religious Teachings 
The Buddha proceeds to list the criteria by which any sensible person can decide which teachings to accept as true. Do not blindly believe religious teachings, he tells the Kalamas, just because they are claimed to be true, or even through the application of various methods or techniques. Direct knowledge grounded in one's own experience can be called upon. He advises that the words of the wise should be heeded and taken into account. He proposes not a passive acceptance but, rather, constant questioning and personal testing to identify those truths which verifiably reduce one's own suffering or misery (Pali: dukkha). 

The Kesamutti Sutta states (Pali expression in parentheses):
Do not go upon what has been acquired by repeated hearing (anussava),
nor upon tradition (paramparā),
nor upon rumor (itikirā),
nor upon what is in a scripture (piṭaka-sampadāna)
nor upon surmise (takka-hetu),
nor upon an axiom (naya-hetu),
nor upon specious reasoning (ākāra-parivitakka),
nor upon a bias towards a notion that has been pondered over (diṭṭhi-nijjhān-akkh-antiyā),
nor upon another's seeming ability (bhabba-rūpatāya),
nor upon the consideration, The monk is our teacher (samaṇo no garū)
Kalamas, when you yourselves know: "These things are good; these things are not blamable; these things are praised by the wise; undertaken and observed, these things lead to benefit and happiness," enter on and abide in them.' 

Thus, the Buddha named ten specific sources whose knowledge should not be immediately viewed as truthful without further investigation to avoid fallacies:

 Oral history
 Tradition
 News sources 
 Scriptures or other official texts
 Suppositional reasoning
 Philosophical dogmatism
Common sense
 One's own opinions
 Experts
 Authorities or one's own teacher

Instead, the Buddha says, only when one personally knows that a certain teaching is skillful, blameless, praiseworthy, and conducive to happiness, and that it is praised by the wise, should one then accept it as true and practice it. Thus, as stated by Soma Thera, the Kalama Sutta is just that; the Buddha's charter of free inquiry:

However, as stated by Bhikkhu Bodhi, this teaching is not intended as an endorsement for either radical skepticism or as for the creation of unreasonable personal truth:

Rather than supporting skepticism or subjective truths, in the sutta the Buddha continues to argue that the three unwholesome roots of greed, hatred and delusion lead to the opposite negative results, i.e. they are unskillful, blameworthy, etc. Consequently, behaviour based on these three roots should be abandoned. Moral judgements of actions can therefore be deduced by analysing whether these actions are based on the unwholesome roots or not.

The Buddha's Assurances
The first and main part of the Kesamutti Sutta is often quoted, but an equally important section of the Kesamutti Sutta follows on from this. This section (17) features the Buddha's four assurances, or solaces. 
The Buddha asserts that a happy and moral life would be correct  if there is no karma and reincarnation. The logic is comparable to that of Pascal's wager.

On these four solaces, Soma Thera wrote:

See also 
 Vīmaṃsaka Sutta

References

External links
Root texts

 Pali text at SuttaCentral (available in five scripts, including Roman and Devanagari)

Translations

With the Kālāmas of Kesamutta, translation by Bhikkhu Sujato
 Kesaputtiya, translation by Bhikkhu Bodhi

Essays

The wisdom of Kalama Sutta
Knowledge and Truth in Early Buddhism Dharmachari Nagapriya from Western Buddhist Review
Help! The Kalama Sutta, Help! by Buddhadasa Bhikkhu.

Anguttara Nikaya
Faith in Buddhism